Vakhtang II (died 1292), of the dynasty of Bagrationi, was king of Georgia from 1289 to 1292. He reigned during the Mongol dominance of Georgia.

A son of the western Georgian ruler, king David VI Narin, by his first wife Tamar, daughter of Prince Amanelisdze, Vakhtang ascended the throne of Georgia, with the consent of the Mongols, in 1289, after his cousin and predecessor, Demetre II was executed by the Great Khan. Loyal to the Mongol rule, his authority extended only over the eastern part of Georgia, while the west of the country was ruled by his father, David VI Narin (until 1293), and later his brother Constantine I (1293–1327).

He died after a reign of three years and his cousin, David VIII, succeeded as the king of Georgia in 1292. David also married Vakhtang's widow, the Mongol princess Oljath. He was buried at the Gelati Monastery near the city of Kutaisi.

References

1292 deaths
Bagrationi dynasty of the Kingdom of Georgia
Kings of Georgia
Eastern Orthodox monarchs
Year of birth unknown